Winifred Bryson (born Winifred Brison; December 20, 1892 – August 20, 1987) was an American actress of the stage and of silent films.

Biography
Winifred Bryson was born Winifred Brison on December 20, 1892, in Los Angeles, the daughter of Oliver A. Brison (1871–1922) and Annie Tilley (1870–1964).

Bryson began to perform publicly in 1914, initially in the musical comedy stage, and in the drama Regeneration with Bert Lytell.

Although her first film was Peer Gynt (1915), her real transition to motion pictures was in the film A Heart to Let (1921). In total, Bryson acted in 19 films, her final screen appearance being in Adoration (1928). Her career ended with the advent of talkies.

She was married twice, first to actor Warner Baxter from 1918 until his death in 1951, and then to Ferdinand H. Manger.

Winifred Bryson died on August 20, 1987. She is interred at Forest Lawn Memorial Park (Glendale).

Filmography

Peer Gynt (1915)
A Heart to Let (1921)
Her Face Value (1921)
South of Suva (1922)
The Great Night (1922)
Suzanna (1923)
Truxton King (1923)
Crashin' Thru (1923)
The Hunchback of Notre Dame (1923)
Thundering Dawn (1923)
Pleasure Mad (1923)
Don't Doubt Your Husband (1924)
The Law Forbids (1924)
Behind the Curtain (1924)
Broken Barriers (1924)
Flirting with Love (1924)
The Lover of Camille (1924)
The Awful Truth (1925)
Adoration (1928)

References

External links

American film actresses
American silent film actresses
Actresses from Los Angeles
1892 births
1987 deaths
20th-century American actresses
Burials at Forest Lawn Memorial Park (Glendale)